Tapes of Wrath is a compilation of promotional videos by American industrial metal band Ministry and their side project Revolting Cocks. Available both in VHS and DVD format, as well as in its entirety on the Internet Archive.

The title is a play on The Grapes of Wrath, a 1939 novel by John Steinbeck, and was also the original title for Ministry's 1992 album Psalm 69: The Way to Succeed and the Way to Suck Eggs.

Track listing
 "Over the Shoulder"
 "Stigmata"
 "Flashback"
 "Burning Inside"
 "The Land of Rape and Honey"
 "Jesus Built My Hotrod"
 "N.W.O."
 "Just One Fix"
 "Lay Lady Lay"
 "Reload"
 "Bad Blood"
 "Crackin' Up"
 "Da Ya Think I'm Sexy?"

References

External links

2000 compilation albums
2000 video albums
Ministry (band) albums
Revolting Cocks albums
Music video compilation albums
Split albums